Nolan Higdon is a critical media literacy scholar and media personality. He is also an author and university lecturer of history and media studies. Higdon has been a lecturer at University of California, Santa Cruz and California State University, East Bay. Higdon is considered an expert in critical media literacy, digital culture, higher education, journalism, fake news, and news media history.
Higdon is frequently featured as an expert voice in documentaries and news outlets such as ABC, CBS, CNBC, NewsNation,  NBC, New York Times, PBS, and the San Francisco Chronicle.

Life
Higdon's education focused on History, Latin American Studies, and Critical Media Literacy Education. In the 2010s, Higdon began writing for Project Censored. One of his first pieces to garner attention was a biography of internet personality Alex Jones.

In 2019, Higdon co-wrote United States of Distraction Media Manipulation in Post-Truth America (And What We Can Do About It), with Mickey Huff. Higdon and Huff argue that the implementation of neoliberal policies in the 1970s created weaknesses in the U.S. news media system that Donald Trump exploited. They argued that a dramatic transformation of the U.S. media and education system were needed to strengthen American democracy. The text was lauded by progressives and critiqued by conservatives.

In The Anatomy of Fake News (University of California Press, 2020), Higdon argued that the U.S. has always wrestled with fake news. Rather than panic, democracies can mitigate the influence of fake news by making critical news literacy education available to the citizenry. Higdon warned that treating government regulation and censorship as a solution to fake news empowers corporations and government to determine what is true and what is false for citizens.  Robin Blom mostly lauded Higdon for making “a convincing argument throughout the book about the need for critical approaches in news literacy education.” However, Blom lamented that “Higdon doubled down on using fake news. Whether he is talking about hoaxes, propaganda, or petty lies…The consistency is praiseworthy, but it also brings us back to square one: What is the actual value of the phrase in public discourse when applied to such a wide range of communication forms?” Wayne Journell celebrated Higdon’s history of fake news arguing that it “provides much-needed context for those struggling to understand both the complexities of fake news and how we arrived at the misinformation era we find ourselves in.” Journell wrote “Higdon is at his strongest when providing historical context.” However, Journell’s “main criticism” of the book was Higdon’s “underlying assumption that consumers of information want accurate information.”

In The Podcaster’s Dilemma: Decolonizing Podcasters in the Era of Surveillance Capitalism (Wiley-Blackwell, 2022), Higdon and Nicholas L. Baham III surveyed a 100 podcasts to determine how media makers are using podcasting as a space of decolonization. In a review of The Podcaster’s Dilemma, University of Toronto’s L. Dugan Nichols said Higdon and Baham “excel at categorizing the gamut of subversive podcasting, informing readers how the hosts of various shows “confront dominant ideologies” (p. 6) through inquiry, criticism, and “cultural reformulation” (p. 6)—which entails the telling of narratives from a subaltern position.” However, Nichols summation of the text was mixed,  “Ultimately, The Podcaster’s Dilemma contains ambiguities and omissions that prevent a more nuanced exploration into the world of leftist podcasting. However, academics conducting research in this area would be remiss to neglect this book. It is an essential read for anyone seeking insight on the resistant potential of a digital medium.”

Views
Higdon regularly publishes op-eds on media, education, and politics.

Education
Higdon has been highly critical of educational organizations that take corporate funding, especially the National Association for Media Literacy Education (NAMLE). In 2019, with Ben Boyington, Higdon wrote “NAMLE’s mission statement promises “empowered media participation,” but its actions empower the tech-industry and surveillance state” at the expense of students. NAMLE co-founder and media literacy expert Renee Hobbs, who was also criticized in the article for accepting corporate funding, called the article an “attack” from the “anti-corporatist media literacy clan.”
Higdon has also criticized NewsGuard and educational organizations such as the Center for Media Literacy for acting as a propagandists for "NATO" and the “military industrial complex.” Higdon also claims that NewsGuard is anti-educaiton because their "list of advisers also includes opponents of organized educators such as the former United States Secretary of Education under Barack Obama, Arne Duncan" who "worked to weaken teacher unions" and "implemented a series of policies that led to teacher unions, such as National Education Association (NEA), to oppose him." Furthermore, Higdon argues that NewsGuard does not educate, it indoctrinates because it "offers “trust ratings” that label content through color coding and what is termed a “Nutrition Label.” This simplistic approach not only proven ineffective, but diminishes the complexity and interconnected ways of establishing credibility and veracity of information in terms of authority, context, history, framing, nuance, and weighing perspectives." Higdon sees NewsGuard as a tool that indoctrinates students to accept corporate funded media while dismissing alternative media. 
Higdon has been highly critical of the corporatization of public education. He warns that “the university system became less focused on scholarship and more focused on providing the veneer of scholarship.” He has covered the way that corporatization exploits adjunct faculty and other non-tenured faculty. Higdon argues that universities often emphasize rhetoric of social justice to mask the ways in which their policies operate to undermine the goals of social justice. Writing in a peer-reviewed study for The Journal of Education Human Resources Higdon claimed that university managers “co-opt social justice language—such as equity and inclusion—to distract from the ways their position and policies perpetuate exploitation and marginalization.”

Politics
Higdon has been a critic of partisanship and routinely criticizes the policies and positions of both the Democratic Party and Republican Party. Higdon's work often centers hyperpartisanship as the biggest threat to democracy. Higdon has accused news media of fostering hyper-partisanship to maximize profits. He claims that news media's hyperpartisan approach to reporting conceals where both the Democratic Party and Republican Party agree such as electoral denialism, federal production of reproductive rights, and free speech. As a result, news audiences end uninformed or misinformed.

Free Speech and Censorship
Higdon claims to be an anti-censorship personality and free speech advocate. He has been highly critical of both the Democratic Party and Republican Party for using fake news as a proxy to censor individuals and organizations. Higdon has argued that the Twitter Files reveal that the government – regardless of the party in power – engages in censorship by proxy when they pressure Big Tech to censor content.
Higdon has been highly critical of the news media's coveage of Elon Musk's purchase of Twitter. He argues that when it comes to free speech, to focus on Musk is to miss how the entire industry of Big Tech manipulates and exploits users. Michael Rectenwald concluded that the critiques of Elon Musk demonstrated that Higdon was anti-free speech

Media
Higdon criticizes legacy media and corporate media for being an industry of "elite lapdogs" that spreads propaganda and fake news.
Higdon is highly critical of Big Tech. He claims that Big Tech spreads propaganda to convince audiences that it is an industry motivated by altruism, but in reality, it is just another greedy and corrupt industry that swindles people.
Higdon has accused Big Tech of concealing efforts to swindle and exploit schools with altruistic motives such as donating chrome books to schools. Higdon and co-author Allison Butler from University of Massachusetts, Amherst in USA Today explained “Schools are becoming the testing ground for new surveillance technologies in large part because compulsory education makes the vast majority of young people in America a captive audience. Often introduced under the guise of safety, surveillance technologies collect copious amounts of data, beyond what might be needed for educational purposes.”

Popular Culture
Higdon’s work is referenced frequently by writer and social media personality MJ Corey in posts titled  “I Won’t Stop Intellectualizing The Kardashians.”

Selected bibliography 
 The Podcasters’ Dilemma: Decolonizing Podcasters in the Era of Surveillance Capitalism, co-authored with Nicholas Baham III, Wiley Press, 2022.
 The Media and Me: A Guide to Critical Media Literacy for Young People, 13 December 2022, Triangle Square.
 The Anatomy of Fake News: Critical News Literacy Education, University of California Press, 2020.
 United States of Distraction Media Manipulation in Post-Truth America (And What We Can Do About It), co-authored with Mickey Huff. City Lights Publishing, 2019.
 Let’s Agree to Disagree: A Critical Thinking Guide to Communication, Conflict Management, and Critical Media Literacy

Selected publications
 'Returning to Neoliberal Normalcy: Analysis of Legacy News Media's Coverage of the Biden Presidency's First 100 Days," co-authored with Emil Marmol and Mickey Huff, In Robert Gutsche Jr. (ed), The Future of the Presidency, Journalism, and Democracy: After Trump, (London: Routledge, 2022). 
 "The Critical Effect: Exploring The Influence Of Critical Media Literacy Pedagogy On College Students' Social Media Behaviors and Attitudes," The Journal of Media Literacy Education. 2021
 "Curricular similarities and differences between critical and acritical media literacy: Supporting teachers' classroom inclusion," co-authored with Allison Butler and J.D. Swerzenski, Democratic Communique, 2021.
 "Time to put your marketing cap on: Mapping digital corporate media curriculum in the age of surveillance capitalism," co-authored with Allison Butler, Review of Education Pedagogy and Cultural Studies, 2021.  
 "Today's Fake News is Tomorrow's Fake History," co-author Mickey Huff, Secrecy and Society Journal, Vol. 2, No. 2, 2021.
 "What is Fake News?: A Foundational Question for Developing Effective Critical News Literacy Education." Democratic Communiqué, Vol. 29, No. 1, April 2020.
 "Rallying Over Balloting: The Origins of Millennial Activism." Journal of Critical Thought and Praxis 8, no. 1 (2019): 3.

References 

People from Owensboro, Kentucky
1983 births
Living people
University of California, Davis alumni